Barb Lockhart (born September 3, 1941) is an American speed skater. She competed at the 1960 Winter Olympics and the 1964 Winter Olympics.

References

External links
 

1941 births
Living people
American female speed skaters
Olympic speed skaters of the United States
Speed skaters at the 1960 Winter Olympics
Speed skaters at the 1964 Winter Olympics
Speed skaters from Chicago
21st-century American women